McNeish is a surname. Notable people with the surname include:

Cameron McNeish, British mountain climber and writer
James McNeish (born 1931), New Zealand writer
Pete Shelley (born Peter Campbell McNeish, 1955-2018), English singer and founding member of Buzzcocks
Robert McNeish (1912–1999), American football player and coach

See also
McNeish, New Brunswick, unincorporated community in Canada
Neish

Surnames of Scottish origin